Red Sea is one of the 18 states of Sudan. It has an area of 212,800 km2 and an estimated population of 1,482,053 (2018). Port Sudan is the capital of the state. Sudan claims, but does not control, the Halaib Triangle, a region disputed between Sudan and Egypt. The original inhabitants of the state are Beja people, who constitute above 65% of the current population with lower wealth and power in the region.

Geography

Overview
Geographically, in the east, bordering the state, is the Red Sea. Inland, mountains run from north to south, which are interrupted by arid plains. To the northwest is the Nubian Desert. The Siyal Islands are located in the disputed area between Egypt and Sudan in the northeast.

The Sudanese state is divided into the eight administrative areas:   Bur Sudan (Port Sudan), Gebiet Elma'din, Halayib, Haya, Sawakin, Sinkat, Gunob Awlieb, Derodieb, Tokar and Ageeg.

Localities
Port Sudan (Capital)
Gebiet Elmadin
Halaib
Haya
Sawakin
Sinkat
Gunob Awlieb
Derodieb
Tokar
Ageeg

References

 
Red Sea State
States of Sudan